Mount Haynes el.  is a prominent peak adjacent to the Madison River in Yellowstone National Park.  The peak was named by then Yellowstone superintendent Horace Albright to honor Frank Jay Haynes (1853–1921), the first official photographer of the park.  Prior to being named Mount Haynes, the peak was unofficially called Mount Burley for D. E. Burley of the Union Pacific Railroad. Today there is an interpretive overlook along the Madison River just opposite the peak.

See also
 Mountains and mountain ranges of Yellowstone National Park

Notes

Haynes
Haynes
Haynes